Como Un Tatuaje is a studio album by K-Paz de la Sierra. It was released on June 2, 2009.

Track listing
Alguién Como Tú
Como Un Tatuaje
No Tiene Nombre
Adoro (featuring Lupe Esparza of Grupo Bronco)
Discúlpame
Quisiera Ser Un Idiota
Te Quedarás Conmigo (featuring Elsa Ríos)
Me Duele Estar Solo
Jamás Te Vayas De Mí
Al Diablo Con Los Guapos aka No Me Supiste Querer (featuring Allisson Lozz)

References

2009 albums
K-Paz de la Sierra albums
Spanish-language albums
Disa Records albums